(–)-α-Pinene synthase (EC 4.2.3.119, (–)-α-pinene/(–)-camphene synthase, (–)-α-pinene cyclase) is an enzyme with systematic name geranyl-diphosphate diphosphate-lyase [cyclizing, (–)-α-pinene-forming]. This enzyme catalyses the following chemical reaction

 geranyl diphosphate  (–)-α-pinene + diphosphate

Cyclase II of Salvia officinalis (sage) gives about equal parts (–)-α-pinene, (–)-β-pinene and (–)-camphene.

References

External links 
 

EC 4.2.3